Sir Charles Clifford, 1st Baronet (1 January 1813 – 27 February 1893) was a New Zealand politician. He was the first Speaker of the New Zealand House of Representatives, serving from 1854 to 1860.

Early life
Clifford was born in Mount Vernon, Scotforth, Lancashire, England. Related to the Barons Clifford of Chudleigh, he came from a wealthy background, and his parents were well-connected. After attending Stonyhurst College, Clifford set out for New Zealand with his cousin William Vavasour, leaving in 1842. Arriving in the New Zealand Company settlement of Wellington, the two established a land, shipping and commissions agency with finance from their parents. They later expanded their holdings, establishing a considerable number of farming ventures. Clifford also worked in partnership with Frederick Weld, another cousin.

At the same time, he was active in the Wellington militia, attaining the rank of captain. He was in charge of Clifford's Stockade in Johnsonville north of Wellington in the mid-1840s. He became a justice of the peace in 1844 and a magistrate in 1846.

New Zealand politician 

At the 1853 New Zealand provincial elections, Clifford was elected to the Wellington Provincial Council, representing the City of Wellington.

On 26 May 1854 when the 1st New Zealand Parliament convened, Clifford was unanimously elected Speaker (having previously been Speaker for the Wellington Provincial Council). He remains the youngest ever Speaker, having been appointed at the age of forty-one. He was Member of the New Zealand Parliament for the City of Wellington from  until his retirement as its speaker in 1860.

The most challenging event to arise during Clifford's speakership was the prorogation of Parliament by Robert Wynyard, the acting Governor. Wynyard, objecting to Parliament's denial that it required royal assent to establish New Zealand's self-rule, ordered Parliament to be suspended. Parliament chose to suspend its own standing orders, allowing it to leave Wynyard's instructions officially "unopened" while it continued to debate. The possibility of suspending standing orders was challenged by Wynyard's supporters, but Clifford eventually decided to allow it. Clifford also allowed the proposal and passage of a motion condemning Wynyard's attempt prorogation.

Retirement and later life 
Clifford retired from Parliament in 1860, deciding to return to England. He did, however, retain a considerable interest in New Zealand's affairs, and advised British authorities on a number of matters. In 1866, he presented the New Zealand Parliament with a ceremonial mace similar to the one used in the British House of Commons. He also retained considerable business interests in New Zealand. Clifford died in London on 27 February 1893.

Honours 
In 1854 on appointment as Speaker of the New Zealand House Representatives Clifford was granted the title of The Honourable. and became The Hon. Charles Clifford Esq. In 1858 Clifford was appointed as a Knight of the United Kingdom of Great Britain and Ireland and became The Hon. Sir Charles Clifford. On 16 July 1887 Clifford was created a baronet, of Flaxbourne, New Zealand, and became The Hon. Sir Charles Clifford Bt., the Clifford-baronetcy still existed as of October 2012.

Family and children 
His great-grandfather: Hugh Clifford, 3rd Baron Clifford of Chudleigh
His uncle: Thomas Hugh Clifford Constable, 1st Baronet Constable of Tixall, Staffordshire

On 13 January 1847, he married Marianne Hercy, who died on 6 October 1899, daughter of John Hercy, of Crichfield House, Berkshire. They had four sons and one daughter:
George Hugh Charles Clifford, 2nd Baronet (1847–1930)
Walter Lovelace Clifford, 4th Baronet (1853–1944)
Mary Lucy Aroha Clifford, born 23 August 1908, died 30 November 1933. Skier, alpine climber, first woman to pilot an aeroplane over Cook Strait. Married Norwegian alpine climber Alf Christaffer Brustad 23 September 1931
Charles William Clifford, born 31 August 1854, died 21 September 1939. He became Justice of the Peace in Market Drayton. He was married twice. On 19 January 1881, he married Mary Eliza Chichester, daughter of Charles Raleigh Chichester (1830–1891), of Burton Constable, Holderness, and Mary Josephine Balfe (d. 1871), of Runnamoat, Roscommon. She died on 7 December 1881 after giving birth to a son (No. 1). On 2 June 1892, he married Cecily (or Sicele Agnes) de Trafford (d. 4 February 1948), daughter of Sir Humphrey de Trafford. With her he had four sons and two daughters (No. 2-7). His children were:
Charles Aston Clifford, born on 16 November 1881, died on 23 March 1898.
Capt. George Gilbert Joseph Clifford, born on 13 April 1893, fell in action on 22 May 1940 in World War II. On 12 May 1925 he married Alice Calder, daughter of J. J. Calder, of Ardargie, Perthshire. They had one daughter:
Anne Caroline Clifford, born on 21 March 1926, died on 8 June 2020.
Lieut. Walter Francis Joseph Clifford, born on 6 September 1894, fell in action on 27 September 1915 in World War I.
Lewis Arthur Joseph Clifford, 5th Baronet (1896–1970)
Roger Charles Joseph Gerrard Clifford, 6th Baronet (1910–1982)
Agnes Clifford, born on 23 March 1899, died in 1981. On 18 November 1924, she married Francis Joseph Southwell, born on 31 March 1900, died 7 January 1953, the second son of the 5th, younger brother of the 6th and father of the 7th Viscount Southwell. They had one son and two daughters.
Rosamund Clifford, born on 10 August 1904.
Francis Charles Clifford, born on 15 December 1856, died on 15 September 1931. He was married twice; the first time on 14 November 1894 with Fanny Dora Charlton, who died 6 June 1906, daughter of Thomas Broughton Charlton, of Chillwell Hall, Nottinghamshire; the second time, as her second husband, on 29 July 1911 with Geraldine Coventry, widowed McKean, who died 9 April 1925, daughter of William George Coventry. He had no issue.
Lucy Mary Clifford, died on 21 January 1936. On 7 February 1877, she married Arthur John Moore, of Mooresfort, Tipperary, who died on 5 January 1904, they had two sons and one daughter. The second son Charles, the only one to marry. He married Dorothie Feilding daughter of Rudolph Feilding, 9th Earl of Denbigh.

References

1813 births
1893 deaths
Clifford, Charles, 1st Baronet
Members of the New Zealand House of Representatives
Clifford, Charles, 1st Baronet
Speakers of the New Zealand House of Representatives
Members of the Wellington Provincial Council
People from Lancaster, Lancashire
New Zealand MPs for Wellington electorates
New Zealand Knights Bachelor
English emigrants to New Zealand
19th-century New Zealand politicians
New Zealand politicians awarded knighthoods
Members of the New Zealand Legislative Council (1841–1853)
New Zealand recipients of British titles